Two human polls comprised the 1997 National Collegiate Athletic Association (NCAA) Division I-A football rankings. Unlike most sports, college football's governing body, the NCAA, does not bestow a national championship, instead that title is bestowed by one or more different polling agencies. There are two main weekly polls that begin in the preseason—the AP Poll and the Coaches Poll.

Legend

AP Poll

Coaches Poll
In the final Coaches Poll of the 1997 season, Nebraska leapfrogged Michigan to secure a share of the national championship, making it the 3rd split championship of the 1990s.  Eight coaches split their first-place votes, with a final tally of 32 first-place votes for Nebraska and 30 for Michigan. The final vote count was Nebraska 1,520, Michigan 1,516.

References

NCAA Division I FBS football rankings